

There are hundreds of catacombs in Malta, principally found in Mdina, the former capital of the island. The catacombs are very small, but are in good preservation.

Many of the catacombs were included on the Antiquities List of 1925.

Vincent Zammit notes that catacombs developed from earlier rock-cut tombs. Wherever burial places were discovered, it is generally presumed that a small community lived in the area. The catacombs are characterised by spaciousness, a smaller extent than those found in other countries, similar in types of tombs to others found around the Mediterranean, but having their own particular type of decorations. Decorations, nevertheless, are rare, which may indicate that with the exception of a few families who had their own private tombs, the community was not wealthy.

Prof. George Cassar observed that the catacombs of Malta have educational value. "They are the key to the understanding of the development of religious rites and beliefs and indicate the birth and spread of Christianity among the small community of Maltese living on the islands. This mysterious yet concrete environment helps towards the creation of a pedagogical setting which the educator can utilise to the full."

Catacombs of Malta
The catacombs include:
 Tal-Mintna Catacombs Mqabba, Malta
 St. Paul's Catacombs Rabat, Malta
 St. Agatha's Catacombs Rabat, Malta
 Salina Catacombs Naxxar, Malta
 St Augustine's CatacombsRabat, Malta
 Ta' Bistra Catacombsnear Mosta, Malta
 St. Cataldus Catacombs Rabat, Malta.

There are many other catacombs in Malta.

References

 A A Caruana. Ancient Pagan Tombs and Christian Cemeteries in the Islands of Malta. Government Printing Office. Malta. 1898.
 A. Mayr, "Die altchristlichen Begrabnisstatten auf Malta" 15 Romische Quartalschrift 216 and 352
 Piotr Drag in Barrowclough and Malone (eds). "Cult of the Dead or Cult for the Dead: Studies of Jewish Catacombs in Malta in Context" in Cult in Context: Reconsidering Ritual in Archaeology. Oxbow Books. Chapter 16.
 Camilleri and Gingell-Littlejohn. "The Triclinia in the Catacombs of Malta". In Scibberas (ed). Proceedings of History Week 1993. Historical Society of Malta. 1997.
 Mario Buhagiar. The Christianisation of Malta: Catacombs, Cult Centres and Churches in Malta. BAR International Series 1674. Archaeopress. 2007. Google Books. Christian Catacombs, Cult Centres and Churches in Malta to 1530. University of London. 1994.
 Rachel Hachlili. "The Hypogea of Malta" in Ancient Jewish Art and Archaeology in the Diaspora. Brill. 1998. Page 273.
 George Percy Badger. "Catacombs" in Description of Malta and Gozo. Malta. 1838. Page 255 et seq.
 "Visit to the Catacombs" in "Palestine Mission" 19 Missionary Herald 138 (No 5, May 1823)

Further reading
 

 
Archaeology-related lists

Malta history-related lists